The Frankish Building is a historic building located at 200 South Euclid Avenue in Ontario, California. Charles Frankish and his son designed and supervised the construction of the building in 1915–16. Frankish was an early investor in Ontario and was responsible for much of the city's planning and promotion, which included constructing a railroad in and planning the layout of the southern half of the city. The building housed storefronts on its first floor and an apartment complex on its second and third floors. Frankish gave the building a Second Renaissance Revival design, a popular American style in the early twentieth century. The building's design includes a flat facade and roof, rusticated quoins on the first floor, and a bracketed wooden cornice.

The building was added to the National Register of Historic Places on August 11, 1980.

See also 
 Ontario State Bank Block

References

Commercial buildings on the National Register of Historic Places in California
Residential buildings on the National Register of Historic Places in California
Renaissance Revival architecture in California
Commercial buildings completed in 1916
Residential buildings completed in 1916
National Register of Historic Places in San Bernardino County, California
Ontario, California